Ettienne de Bruyn (born 31 March 1977) was a South African cricketer. He was a right-handed batsman and wicket-keeper who played for Northerns B. He was born in Pretoria.

De Bruyn made a single first-class appearance for the team, during the 1997–98 UCB Bowl competition. Batting alongside twin brother, Pierre, Ettiene scored 41 runs in the first innings in which he batted, while his brother picked up his debut first-class century.

In the second innings of the match, as his brother scored just a single run, Ettiene did the same.

External links
Ettiene de Bruyn at Cricket Archive 

1977 births
Living people
South African cricketers
South African twins
Twin sportspeople